26 September 2021

A luggage scale, also called a baggage scale or a suitcase scale, is used to weigh luggage to avoid luggage being overweight.

Weighing scales